Ceroplesis scorteccii is a species of beetle in the family Cerambycidae. It was described by Breuning in 1940. It is known from Ethiopia.

References

Endemic fauna of Ethiopia
scorteccii
Beetles described in 1940